Radosław Cierzniak (born 24 April 1983) is a Polish former professional footballer who played as a goalkeeper for a number of teams in both Poland and Ukraine, such as Obra Kościan, Sparta Oborniki, Volyn Lutsk, Karpaty Lviv, Amica Wronki and Lech Poznań.

Club career
Born in Szamocin, Cierzniak started his career in the 2001–02 season. In 2002, he joined Volyn Lutsk on a one-year contract but lack of opportunities led him to returning to Poland  by joining Stomil Olsztyn, where he made 13 appearances.

He then joined Aluminium Konin, where he became first choice goalkeeper and made 29 appearances. The club would finish in second place in the league. After 29 appearances at Aluminium Konin, he signed for Amica Wronki. He made his UEFA Cup debut against French side Auxerre, coming on as substitute for Arkadiusz Malarz after he had been injured, but only nine minutes later, Cierzniak was sent off for professional foul. On 20 April 2005, he made his league debut in a 2–2 draw against Odra Wodzisław. The following season, he became the first-choice goalkeeper for the club.

In 2006 Amica Wronki merged with Lech Poznan. Cierzniak made his Lech Poznán debut in the UEFA Intertoto Cup in a 3–1 loss against Tiraspol on 8 July 2006. However, he rarely featured in the first team as Krzysztof Kotorowski took the goalkeeping position. After six months at Lech Poznań, he joined Korona Kielce. On 28 April 2007, he made his debut in a 1–0 loss against Odra Wodzisław. Three season later, Cierzniak lost his first team place to Zbigniew Małkowski, which resulted in him leaving the club when his contract expired on 31 December 2010.

On 12 January 2011, he signed a one-year contract with Cypriot club Alki Larnaca. By the end of the season, he had made 21 appearances.

Cierzniak agreed a two-year contract with Scottish Premier League club Dundee United in February 2012, due to start in the summer. He joined KS Cracovia in his homeland on a three-month deal in preparation for his move to Dundee United. Cierzniak made his debut for Cracovia on 23 March 2012 in a 3–1 loss against Górnik Zabrze. On 2 August 2012, Cierzniak made his debut for Dundee United, in the third qualifying round of the UEFA Europa League as United drew 2–2 draw against Russian team Dynamo Moscow However, Dynamo Moscow would thrash Dundee United 5–0 in the second leg, eliminating the club from the Europa League. On 5 August 2012, he made his league debut in a 3–0 win over Hibernian, where he got his first clean sheet. In the next league match, a derby against Dundee, which Dundee United won 3–0, he made a double save from Nicky Riley to prevent Dundee taking an early lead. After the match, teammate Willo Flood praised Cierzniak's performance. Cierzniak said he was delighted to have experienced his first ever derby. Having been established as the club's first choice goalkeeper throughout the season, on 6 March 2013, Cierzniak signed a new contract at Dundee United, keeping him at the club until May 2015. Upon signing the new contract, United Manager Jackie McNamara said on the club's website: "This extension is merited because Rado has shown that he is an excellent SPL goalkeeper."

International career
Cierzniak debuted for the Poland national team in a friendly versus Lithuania in February 2009.

Honours
Legia Warsaw
 Ekstraklasa: 2016–17, 2017–18, 2019–20, 2020–21
 Polish Cup: 2017–18

References

External links
 
 
 National team stats 
 

1983 births
Living people
People from Szamocin
Sportspeople from Greater Poland Voivodeship
Polish footballers
Association football goalkeepers
Poland international footballers
Ekstraklasa players
Cypriot First Division players
Scottish Premier League players
Scottish Professional Football League players
Obra Kościan players
Amica Wronki players
Lech Poznań players
Korona Kielce players
FC Volyn Lutsk players
Alki Larnaca FC players
Dundee United F.C. players
Wisła Kraków players
Legia Warsaw players
Polish expatriate footballers
Polish expatriate sportspeople in Ukraine
Expatriate footballers in Ukraine
Polish expatriate sportspeople in Cyprus
Expatriate footballers in Cyprus
Polish expatriate sportspeople in Scotland
Expatriate footballers in Scotland